Club de Futbol Damm is a Spanish football team based in Barcelona, in the autonomous community of Catalonia. Founded in 1954, it is dedicated to youth football.

Their Juvenil A squad play in the Group III of the División de Honor Juvenil de Fútbol. The club is mainly known for their successful youth setup, which helps players to develop and join other senior clubs in the region.

Season to season (Juvenil A)

Superliga / Liga de Honor sub-19
Seasons with two or more trophies shown in bold

División de Honor Juvenil
Seasons with two or more trophies shown in bold

Famous players
Note: List consists of players who appeared in La Liga or reached international status.

References

External links
 

Football clubs in Catalonia
Football clubs in Barcelona
Association football clubs established in 1954
1954 establishments in Spain
División de Honor Juvenil de Fútbol